Rumsey is a surname. Notable people with the surname include:

 Andrew Rumsey (born 1968), British Anglican priest and bishop-designate 
Benjamin Rumsey (1734–1808), American jurist
Brad Rumsey (born 1986), American football coach
Catherine Cool Rumsey, American politician
Charles Cary Rumsey (1879–1922), American sculptor
Deborah J. Rumsey (born 1961), American statistician
David Rumsey (disambiguation), multiple people
Digby Rumsey (born 1952), English film director
Edward Rumsey (1796–1868), American politician
Elida Rumsey, American Civil War nurse
Elisha Rumsey (c. 1785 – 1827), American pioneer
Fred Rumsey (born 1935), English cricketer
Howard Rumsey (1917–2015), American jazz double-bassist
James Rumsey (1743–1792), American mechanical engineer
Janet Rumsey (1931–2008), American baseball player
Julian Sidney Rumsey (1823–1886), American politician
Mary Harriman Rumsey (1881–1934), American activist
Norman Rumsey (1922–2007), New Zealand optical designer
Robert Rumsey (1844–1884), English cricketer
Shirley Rumsey, English musician
Tessa Rumsey, American poet
Vern Rumsey (1973–2020), American bass guitarist
Victor H. Rumsey (1919–2015), American electrical engineer
Walter Rumsey (1584–1660), Welsh judge and politician
William Rumsey (1841–1903), American lawyer, diplomat and judge